Jean-Louis Petit may refer to:
 Jean-Louis Petit (composer)
 Jean-Louis Petit (surgeon)